The F.A. DeCanizares House is a historic home in Sarasota, Florida. It is located at 1215 North Palm Avenue. On March 22, 1984, it was added to the U.S. National Register of Historic Places.

References

External links
 Sarasota County listings at National Register of Historic Places
 Florida's Office of Cultural and Historical Programs
 Sarasota County listings
 F.A. DeCanizares House

Houses on the National Register of Historic Places in Sarasota County, Florida
Houses in Sarasota, Florida
Mediterranean Revival architecture in Florida